Dharavandhoo Airport  is a domestic airport located on the island of Dharavandhoo, part of the Baa Atoll in Maldives. It was opened on 17 October 2012 by President Mohamed Waheed Hassan. Flight operations began to the airport on 15th of that month.

Facilities

Airlines and destinations

See also
 List of airports in the Maldives
 List of airlines of the Maldives

References

Airports in the Maldives
Airports established in 2012